Victoria E. Morales is an American attorney and politician from Maine. She is the representative for Maine House District 33. She is on the Ethics committee and the Criminal Justice and Public Safety committee. She ran uncontested in the 2020 House election.

References

Year of birth missing (living people)
Living people
University of Maine alumni
21st-century American politicians
Women state legislators in Maine
Democratic Party members of the Maine House of Representatives
Politicians from South Portland, Maine
21st-century American women politicians